Lamprinus is a genus of beetles belonging to the family Staphylinidae.

The species of this genus are found in Europe.

Species:
 Lamprobyrrhulus nitidus (Schaller, 1783)

References

Staphylinidae
Staphylinidae genera